β-Ketoisocaproic acid is an intermediate in the metabolism of leucine.

References 

Beta-keto acids